Banda Los Recoditos is a Mexican Banda formed in Mazatlán, Sinaloa. It was founded in 1989 by friends and family members of Banda el Recodo by Cruz Lizárraga. Alfonso Lizárraga and Pancho Barraza, the first vocalists, were two of the more than dozen bandmembers comprising the original incarnation of the band. After releasing several albums, in 2010 the band released their album ¡Ando Bien Pedo!, featuring the single of the same title, which became a number-one hit in the Billboard Hot Latin Songs chart.

Controversies 

In 1998 Alfonso Lizárraga member of Banda El Recodo  come one fit them the name so that the band was forced to change their name to Banda Vuelta De Río. This band recorded three albums with Musart and some members returned to Recoditos, the actual band.

There has been some opposition to the current band because most of the original members still belong to the band Vuelta De Río. Although the current band plays the hits of the original musical group, there are  arguments that there actually only is one version of the original band.

Recent Nominations 
BANDA LOS RECODITOS... NOMINATED IN TWO CATEGORIES- LATIN GRAMMY 2016
The Band is nominated in two important Regional Mexican categories with their album "ME ESTÁ GUSTANDO."  
The award ceremony will take place November 17, 2016 at the T-Mobile Arena, in Las Vegas, Nevada.

Banda Los Recoditos is also nominated for "Band Of the Year" in the Premios de La Radio awards.  
They are nominated with the likes of La Septima Banda, La Arrolladora Banda el Limon, Banda Ms.
The ceremony will take place November 3, 2016 at the Dolby Theatre in Los Angeles, California.

Band members

Source:

Style
The music of Los Recoditos is like most Bandas Sinoalenses, featuring vocalists harmonizing to a third and high horn hits in the background. The band often uses the I-vi-IV-V chord progression (known by the 50s Progression). The meter is usually a 3-4 or a 4-4, but 6-8 or a hemiola between 3-4 and 6-8 is not uncommon.

Discography
A Bailar De Caballito (1990) (First Album Win Linda Records)
Lola La Bailera (1990)
Las rejas no matan (1991)
Tu abandono(1992)
Un Sólo Cielo (1993)
Adios  Amor (1994)
Volumen 4 (1995)
Canto Para Tí (1995)
Siempre te voy a recordar (1996)
El Nylon (1997)
Oye Amigo (1996)
Banda Sinaloense Los Recoditos (1997)
Y Todavia Hay Amor (1998) (Last album on Musart)
Como La Primera Vez (2001) (Only album on Sony Music)
Puras Romanticas (2004)
Si No Existieras (2004) (First album on Fonovisa)
En Accion (2005)
Dos Enamorados (2005)
Vengo a Decirte (2007)(Last album on Fonovisa)
Y Seguimos Enamorados (2009)
'¡Ando Bien Pedo! (2010)
A Toda Madre (2011)
Para Ti Solita (2012)
El Free (2013)
Sueno xxx (2014)
Me Esta Gustando (2016)
Los Gustos Que Me Doy (2017)
Perfecta (2019)
30 Aniversario (2020)
Vivir La Vida (2021)
Me Siento A Todo Dar (2022)

References

Musical groups established in 1989
Mexican musical groups
Sinaloa
Universal Music Latin Entertainment artists
1989 establishments in Mexico
Latin Grammy Award winners